Reversal theory is a structural, phenomenological theory of personality, motivation, and emotion in the field of psychology. It focuses on the dynamic qualities of normal human experience to describe how a person regularly reverses between psychological states, reflecting their motivational style, the meaning they attach to a situation at a given time, and the emotions they experience.

Introduction

Unlike many theories related to personality, reversal theory does not consist of static traits (trait theory), but rather a set of dynamics motivational states. As people cycle through states, they will see different things as important, experience different emotions, react differently, and look for quite different rewards. Motivation drives orientation, styles, perspective, and desires. The theory emphasizes the changeability of human nature.

Hundreds of empirical papers have been published testing, or using, one or another idea from the theory. It has also generated over twenty books, many standardized questionnaires, its own journal, and various training techniques used in a number of countries. Workshops have been developed for self-development, leadership, creativity, and salesmanship among other topics. Other previous and current applications of the theory include risk-taking, violence, creativity, humor, sexual behavior, ritual, terrorism, advertising, fantasy, and so on.

The Reversal Theory Society has its own journal, the Journal of Motivation, Emotion, and Personality. A number of instruments have been created to measure reversal theory phenomena. Many of these focus on state dominance – which states are more prevalent for a person over time. While others attempt to capture the phenomena of the reversals themselves – how people's states shift in specific situations.

Origins

Reversal theory was initially developed primarily by British psychologist Dr. Michael Apter and psychiatrist Dr. Ken Smith in the mid-1970s. The starting point was Smith's recognition of a personality dimension which he believed had been largely overlooked but was of critical importance in understanding certain kinds of pathology. He coined the terms 'telic' and 'paratelic' to describe the endpoints of this dimension, which could be described in less precise language as the dimension of serious to playful. Apter made a fundamental change to this idea by suggesting that we were not dealing here with enduring traits but with passing states.

Apter's suggestion was that in everyday life people moved backward and forward between two opposite states, which were alternative ways of seeing the world. The dimension was really a dichotomy. In the normal way of things, people were playful and serious in turn. (Such alternations are widespread in all kinds of different systems in the real world and known in cybernetics as 'bistable states'. Examples would be teeter-totters (seesaws), toggle switches, and Gestalt reversal figures.) In emphasizing this kind of dynamic, they would be challenging the emphasis placed in personality theory on enduring traits. To them, people were more like waves than the rocks that they broke on.

Conceptual framework

States
The theory distinctively proposes that human experience is structurally organized into metamotivational domains, of which four have been identified. Each domain consists of a pair of opposing values or motives so that only one of each pair can be experienced in any given moment. Each pair in a domain represents two opposite forms of motivation – only one state in each pair can be active at a time. Humans reverse between the states in each pair depending on a number of factors, including our inherent tendency to adopt one style over the other.

Serious/Playful (Telic/Paratelic)

Conforming/Rebellious

The first four motivational states are referred to as the somatic pairs. This is due to the significance of their interaction, e.g. Serious-rebelliousness (organizing a protest march) is noticeably different from playful rebelliousness (telling a joke in a business meeting).

Mastery/Sympathy

Self/Other (Autic/Alloic)

The last four motivational states are referred to as the transactional pairs. This is due to the significance of their interaction, e.g. self-mastery (running a marathon) is noticeably different from others-mastery (training someone to run a marathon).

Reversals
The primary emphasis of reversal theory lies in the concept of reversals – by "triggering" a reversal between states, we can change the meaning attributed to the situation. E.g., what seemed serious before, can suddenly feel exciting with the right change in situation or mindset. Reversals can be created by changing a situation, reframing it, role-playing, or using specific symbols or props that invoke a specific state (e.g., a toy can help trigger the Playful state; the image of a traffic sign may invoke the Conforming state). 
Reversals can occur as a result of frustration, or by the passing of time (called satiation). 
Reversal theory links the motivational states above to emotion by proposing that if one is in a state and things are going well, positive emotions result; if the needs of the state are not fulfilled, negative emotions result.

Synergy
Cognitive synergy is what happens when one experiences opposite qualities attached to the same thing at the same time. Examples would include works of art, metaphors, jokes, toys, and so on. Thus, a representational painting is both a three-dimensional scene and a flat canvas with paint on it. Being aware of both these aspects is what gives it a special synergic quality in experience. But reversal theory offers an interesting perspective on the phenomenon: When perceived in the serious (telic) state synergies tend to be a nuisance, while in the playful (paratelic) state they are usually intriguing and fun.

Bistability

This the basis for the principle of homeostasis that is found in many fields of study, including many theories found in psychology. Figure 1 (above) demonstrates this principle. The idea that humans are always looking for a perfect medium state of arousal and anything too extreme in either direction is not to be desired, i.e., boredom or anxiety.

Reversal theory proposes an altogether different view of arousal, which is what is called bistability. Bistability emphasizes polarity in the hedonic tone, and this is represented by the curves of the "butterfly curves" figure. It demonstrates that arousal is experienced in each state in a different – indeed opposite way and has its own unique range of emotions. In the serious (telic) state, represented by the solid curve, this range is from relaxation to anxiety, and in the playful paratelic) state, represented by the dashed curve, from boredom to excitement.

In the serious state, one becomes anxious as threatening or demanding events raise arousal levels, but pleasantly relaxed when a task is completed. In the paratelic state, one becomes pleasantly excited as one becomes more emotionally involved and aroused, but bored if there is a lack of stimulation. It will be seen from this that reversal theory gives a very different interpretation of arousal from optimal arousal theory, with its famous inverted u-curve. This enables it, among other things, to make sense of the fact that some activities involve very high arousal and intense pleasure (sexual behavior, for example, and playing or watching a sport) – something which optimal arousal theory has no satisfactory way of dealing with. It also introduces a certain dynamic into the situation through the possibility of sudden changes in experience, and it will have been noticed that as arousal gets higher or lower, so the effect of reversal from one curve to the other becomes more dramatic. 
The world is seen differently – there is a different experiential structure in each case. One aspect of this is what reversal theory calls 'the protective frame'. This reversal within arousal explains such phenomena as why people indulge in dangerous sports, why people commit recreational violence, the nature of sexual perversion and sexual dysfunction, the attraction of military combat, and the nature of post-traumatic stress disorder. For example, people gratuitously confront themselves with risk in dangerous sports like parachuting and rock-climbing, in order to achieve high (not moderate) arousal. This high arousal may be experienced as anxiety, but if the danger is overcome (and thereby a protective frame set up), then there will be a switch to the playful (in the moment) curve, and this will result in excitement as intense as the anxiety had been – and hopefully longer-lasting.

Dominance
Reversal theory introduced the term dominance to make the motivational styles a testable factor in psychometrics, so as to expand its application regions. Dominance means the tendency that an individual has to be one kind of person or another over time. An individual may reverse into a Playful (paretelic) state, but if he or she is Serious (telic) dominant, he or she will easily reverse into Serious states. This term distinguished the reversal theory from the traditional trait theory, namely, one's personality is not a permanent asset but a reversing tendency changing in accordance to the environment, etc.

Parapathic emotions and the protective frame
All high arousal emotions will be experienced pleasantly in the form of excitement when the individual is in the paratelic state – even the most otherwise unpleasant emotions. Such paradoxical emotions are referred to in the theory as 'parapathic emotions'. So it is possible to have, for example, parapathic anxiety, as in riding a roller coaster. Parapathic emotions arise when the ongoing experience involves what the theory calls a 'protective frame'. Sometimes this makes negative emotions enjoyable, like fear in a horror movie, but this can also make psychologically difficult situations bearable. The frame can be imagined as an emotional safety bubble. Sometimes this frame, which can be physical or psychological, may serve as what can be imagined an emotional safety bubble.

Psychodiversity
Humans are complex and act in accordance with many, even contradictory values. The needs they produce may vary, but any attempt to structure them (linear, hierarchical, etc.) is left wanting. The normally-functioning person, then, is able to access all the states at different times, and, over time, obtain all the different satisfactions that are available in these various states. Such a well-rounded person may be said to display psychodiversity.
The term can be understood by analogy with the biological concept of biodiversity. A biodiverse ecology is one that contains many different species. It is healthy in that, if the climate changes, at least some species will survive to start rebuilding the ecology. Likewise, a person who displays psychodiversity is able to survive personal problems and thrive in different and changing environments.

Scientific application
Reversal theory has attracted widespread interest among the research community, especially of psychologists, and more than 500 papers and book chapters have been written, along with almost 30 books. There have been some 70 graduate dissertations, mainly doctoral.

The theory has been used in the elucidation of a wide diversity of topics and one of the main strengths of the theory is its comprehensiveness and potential for integration. Here, in no special order, are some of the topics that have been worked on: 
Stress, addiction, anxiety, depression, delinquency, hooliganism, personality disorder, boredom, gambling, crime, violence, leadership, teamwork, creativity, risk-taking, teaching, dieting, humor, aesthetics, play, sport, exercise, design, advertising, corporate culture, consumer behavior, hotel management, sexual behavior, religious faith, ritual, spying, and marital relations.

Practical application

Sport psychology
Following the publication of John Kerr's Counseling Athletes: Applying Reversal Theory, reversal theory has started to be recognized as a useful approach to training, exercise, and sport, although it is difficult to know how many athletes and coaches are actually using it. Kerr and others have reported it being used in a variety of sports, including soccer, figure skating, golf, and martial arts. Graham Winter, a coach for three Australian Olympic teams, utilizes reversal theory for the psychological health of his athletes.

Future
The recent rise in interest in personal measurement ("the measured self"), advances in the technology enabling/supporting personal measurement (e.g., smartphones, wearable technology), and developments in modeling and analyzing repeatedly-measured experiences (i.e., ecological momentary assessment, experience sampling, and multilevel modeling) the idea (reversals and the theory) provides a framework and sets of hypotheses regarding change over time. At present, such measurement is at the descriptive stage, and the application of reversal theory can move this body of work toward more predictive science.

Biological and medical researchers have begun to develop instrumentation that allows the tracking of physiological variables in real-time from individual subjects in their natural settings. Psychologists are beginning to look at the possibilities opened up to them by this technology, and reversal theory is perfectly positioned to take advantage of it. For example, using the recent "Reversal Theory State Measure" to study the causes of reversals, the relative frequency of reversal in different people ('reversibility'), the biases among the eight states in different people, and so on. There are many ongoing areas of application for this such as telehealth.

Instrumentation
Since the formulation of reversal theory, dozens of psychometric instruments have been developed to test the motivational styles. An early instrument was The Telic Dominance Scale (TDS) developed by Murgatroyd, Rushton, Apter & Ray in 1978. This scale was aimed primarily at assessing Telic Dominance.

The Apter Motivational Style Inventory (AMSP) is a research instrument that assesses dominant styles. A commercial version is used for training and development by practitioners educated by Apter Solutions.

Others include the Apter Leadership Profile [System] (ALPS), which utilizes a 360-degree measurement of leaders' motivational micro-climates, and how they interact with their direct reports. The Reversal Theory State Measure (RTSM), a more recently developed tool system, utilizes technology to measure ongoing motivational state changes over time.

Society, journal, and conference
A society for researchers and practitioners in reversal theory was set up in 1983. The society has organized regular biennial conferences since then. In 2013, an open-access journal was launched: Journal of Motivation, Emotion and Personality: Reversal Theory Studies.

The Reversal Theory Society's presidents have been:
1983-1985 Stephen Murgatroyd
1985-1987 Michael Cowles
1987-1989 John Kerr
1989-1991 Stephen Murgatroyd
1991-1993 Kathleen O'Connell
1993-1995 Sven Svebak
1995-1997 Ken Heskin
1997-1999 Mark McDermott and Murray Griffin
1999-2001 Kathy LaFreniere
2001-2003 George V. Wilson
2003-2005 Richard Mallows
2005-2007 Koenraad Lindner
2007-2009 Joanne Hudson
2009-2011 Tony Young
2011-2013 Jennifer Tucker
2013-2015 Fabien D. Legrand
2015-2017 Kenneth M. Kramer
2017-2019 Joanne Hudson
2019-2021 Jay Lee
2021-2023 Nathalie Duriez

References

Further reading

 Apter, M.J. (Ed.) (2001) Motivational Styles in Everyday Life:  A Guide to Reversal Theory. Washington, D.C.: American Psychological Association. 
 Apter, M.J. (2007)  Reversal Theory: The Dynamics of Motivation, Emotion and Personality, 2nd. Edition. Oxford: Oneworld Publications. 
 Apter, M.J. (2018) Zigzag: Reversal and Paradox in Human Personality, Matador.
 Apter, M.J. (2007)  Danger: Our Quest for Excitement.  Oxford: Oneworld Publications. 
 Carter, S. and Kourdi, J. (2003) The Road to Audacity: Being Adventurous in Life and Work. Palgrave Macmillan. 
 Kerr, J.H. (2004). Rethinking aggression and violence in sport. London: Routledge.
 Kerr, J.H. (2001). Counseling Athletes: Applying Reversal Theory. London: Routledge.
 Kerr, J.H., Lindner, K.H. and Blaydon (2007). Exercise Dependence. London: Routledge. 
 Mallows, D. (2007) Switch to Better Behaviour Management: Reversal Theory in Practice. Peter Francis Publishers.
 Rutledge, H. & Tucker, J. (2007)  Reversing Forward: A Practical Guide to Reversal Theory,  Fairfax, Virginia: OKA (Otto Kroeger Associates).

Psychological theories